Aurelija Misevičiūtė (born 24 April 1986 in Klaipėda) is a Lithuanian former tennis player.

In her career, she won one singles titles on the ITF Women's Circuit. On 29 September 2003, she reached her best singles ranking of world number 284. On 9 February 2004, she peaked at number 337 in the doubles rankings.

Misevičiūtė retired from professional tennis 2011.

ITF finals

Singles: 2 (1–1)

Doubles: 2 (0–2)

External links
 
 
 

1986 births
Living people
Sportspeople from Klaipėda
Lithuanian female tennis players

Aurelija Miseviciute has been inducted to the 2019 University of Arkansas Sports Hall of Honor. She became the most decorated women’s tennis player in University of Arkansas history. She earned All America honors twice and finished her career with Arkansas as the leader in career singles wins (125), doubles wins (86) and singles winning percentage (.886).
Capturing the ITA Indoor Championship in 2007, she climbed from a 2008 preseason ranking of 117 to claim the No. 1 ranking and win the ITA Indoor Championship again in 2008. 

Respectfully submitted by Steve Christian of Fort Smith, Arkansas